Laos competed at the 2010 Summer Youth Olympics, the inaugural Youth Olympic Games, held in Singapore from 14 August to 26 August 2010.

Athletics

Track and Road Events

Badminton

Boys

Swimming

References

External links
Competitors List: Laos – Singapore 2010 official site

2010 in Laotian sport
Nations at the 2010 Summer Youth Olympics
Laos at the Youth Olympics